The World Cup is an invitational  team snooker tournament created by Mike Watterson. The annual contests featured teams of three (two since 2011) players representing their country against other such teams. Steve Davis has won the event more times than any other player, with four titles for England.

History
The event began in 1979 as the World Challenge Cup with the sponsorship of State Express. It was held at the Haden Hill Leisure Centre, Birmingham, with six teams participating: England, Northern Ireland, Wales, Canada, Australia and Rest of the World. The teams were broken into two round-robin groups and the matches were best of 15 frames. The top teams in the groups met in the final. In 1980 the tournament moved to the New London Theatre and the Northern Ireland team was replaced by an All-Ireland team.

The event was renamed to the World Team Classic in 1981 and moved to the Hexagon Theatre in Reading. The matches were reduced to best of seven and the top two teams from the groups advanced to the semi-finals. This time seven teams competed. Team Rest of the World were replaced by Team Scotland and instead of an All-Ireland team both the Republic of Ireland and Northern Ireland fielded teams. After the 1983 event State Express ended their sponsorship of the event and the tournament's place in the snooker calendar was taken by the Grand Prix.

The event was moved to spring for the 1984/1985 season and the event was renamed the World Cup. It was held at the International, Bournemouth. The tournament also became a knock-out contest and featured eight teams. Ireland and Northern Ireland fielded a combined team, known as All-Ireland, the Rest of the World team returned and the defending champions, England, had two teams. The event was terminated after the 1990 event.

The event was briefly revived for 1996 and it was held at the Amari Watergate Hotel in Bangkok, Thailand. There were many entries and qualification was held. The 20 qualified teams were split into four groups of five and the top two teams of the groups advanced to the quarter-finals.

On 22 March 2011 it was revealed that the World Professional Billiards and Snooker Association planned to revive the event with the sponsorship of PTT and EGAT. It was held between 11 and 17 July at the Bangkok Convention Centre, Bangkok and twenty two-men teams participated at the tournament.

Winners

See also
 Nations Cup (snooker)

References

 
Snooker non-ranking competitions
Snooker competitions in England
Cue sports competitions in Thailand
Snooker competitions in China
Recurring sporting events established in 1979
1979 establishments in England
World cups